Galåen may refer to:

Alternative name of Galåa
Jens Galaaen